Moonfleet may refer to:
 Moonfleet (novel), a 1898 novel by J. Meade Falkner
 Moonfleet (film), a 1955 film directed by Fritz Lang, inspired by the novel
 Moonfleet (1984 TV series), a British period television drama series, based on the novel
 Moonfleet (2013 TV series), a British period television drama series, based on the novel

See also
 Moonfleet & Other Stories, a 2010 album by Chris de Burgh